Stephanie Lynn McCann (born April 22, 1977 in Vancouver, British Columbia) is a Canadian pole vaulter.

She finished fifth at the 2001 Summer Universiade and tenth at the 2004 Summer Olympics. She won bronze medals at the 2002 Commonwealth Games, the 2003 Pan American Games and the 2006 Commonwealth Games. She also competed at the World Championships in 2001 and 2003 without reaching the final.

Her personal best jump is 4.41 metres, achieved in July 2003 in Atascadero.

McCann is now a qualified physiotherapist, acupuncturist and Stott Pilates instructor in Vancouver.

References

External links

sports-reference

1977 births
Living people
Canadian female pole vaulters
Athletes (track and field) at the 2004 Summer Olympics
Olympic track and field athletes of Canada
Athletes (track and field) at the 2002 Commonwealth Games
Athletes (track and field) at the 2006 Commonwealth Games
Commonwealth Games bronze medallists for Canada
Athletes from Vancouver
Commonwealth Games medallists in athletics
Athletes (track and field) at the 2003 Pan American Games
Pan American Games bronze medalists for Canada
Pan American Games medalists in athletics (track and field)
Medalists at the 2003 Pan American Games
Medallists at the 2002 Commonwealth Games
Medallists at the 2006 Commonwealth Games